Trevor Balfour Hunter (25 January 1915 – 8 May 2002) was a New Zealand aviator. She accompanied Ted Harvie on his record-breaking flight from North Cape to Bluff in December 1933. She was the first of five New Zealand women accepted to fly with the Air Transport Auxiliary during the Second World War.

Life 
Hunter was born in Whanganui on 25 January 1915 to Alice Elsie and Marmaduke Archer Hunter. She was named Trevor as her mother was sure that the baby would be a boy. She was a member of the Whanganui Aero club and gained her 'A' license in 1933, flying solo at age 16.

The record lasted 28 years. She was also one of the four female pilots who escorted Jean Batten on her arrival to New Zealand following Batten's solo flight from Britain in 1934.

She joined the ATA in 1941. Like other women from New Zealand who joined she had to pay her way to Britain to be examined. She was enlisted in the Ferry Service and flew planes from their factories to squadron bases. In this time she logged 1,200 hours of solo flying and flew 42 types of aircraft including, Spitfires, Warwicks, Mitchells and Wellingtons.

After the war, Hunter was employed as a commercial pilot. In 1950, she married a journalist, James Colway, who became the editor of the Whanganui Chronicle from 1964.

References 

Air Transport Auxiliary pilots
Women aviators
New Zealand aviators
New Zealand World War II pilots
1915 births
2002 deaths
People from Whanganui